Susanna Dalton is an American actress, who made her TV debut in 1979 in the Show Delta House as Mandy Pepperidge. She also played C.C. Brandt in Stunts Unlimited (1980), Gloria in Paternity (1981) and Nancy Barwood in A Little Sex (1982). She now teaches at the Westchester Conservatory of Music and resides in New York City.  She grew up in Havertown, PA, graduating from Haverford High School in 1972.  She is known for her distinctive husky voice and does many voice overs.

References

External links

Year of birth missing (living people)
Living people
American television actresses
21st-century American women